The Togo national basketball team is the men's national basketball team representing Togo in international competition. In August 2010, the team qualified for the 2011 African Championship in Madagascar.

Competitive performance

FIBA AfroBasket
Togo has made four appearances in the AfroBasket (formerly African Championship), its first being in 1972. Their best finish was their 6th place in 1974. After the country's third appearance in 1978, Togo was missing from the stage for 33 years, before returning at  the 2011 edition.

Current roster

At the AfroBasket 2013 qualification:

|}

| valign="top" |

Head coach

Assistant coaches

Legend

Club – describes lastclub before the tournament
Age – describes ageon 1 July 2012

|}

Head coach position
  Guy Arneaud - 2011

See also
Togo women's national basketball team
Samson Johnson

References

External links
Presentation at FIBA.com
History of Togo's Basketball Federation (in French)

Men's national basketball teams
Basketball in Togo
Basketball
1963 establishments in Togo